Ugo Canefri (1148 – 8 October 1233), also known as Ugo da Genova, was an Italian crusader and subsequently a health worker.

Canefri was born, probably in 1148, into the family of the counts of Canefri: feudal lords of Gamondio (today Castellazzo Bormida), Fresonara and Borgo Rovereto in the area of today's Alessandria.

He took part in the Third Crusade together with Conrad of Montferrat and Guala Bicchieri, consul of Vercelli.

In his early twenties, having joined the Knights of Malta, he abandoned his career at arms and was sent to care for the sick in the hospital of the Commenda di San Giovanni di Pré in Genoa. He continued in this work for more than fifty years.

He was beatified soon after his death in 1233, and later canonised as a saint of the Roman Catholic Church. He is venerated particularly in Alessandria and Genoa and within the Order of Malta.  His feast day is 8 October.

References
 Giambattista Verdura, Vita morte e miracoli di S. Ugone cavaliere gerosolimitano, Genova 1665.
 Vincenzo Persoglio, Sant'Ugo cavaliere ospitaliere gerosolimitano e la Commenda di S. Giovanni di Pré, Genova 1887.
 Carlo Caviglione, ‘Ugo Canefri cavaliere della fede e della carità’ in Il Cittadino, Genova 18/10/1970.
 Cassiano da Langasco, ‘Ugo Canefri un precursore del servizio sociale ai poveri’ in La voce alessandrina, 4/10/1980.
 Carla Reschia, ‘Ugo Canefri tra miracoli e carità’ in La Stampa - Edizione di Alessandria, 8/10/1989.

1148 births
1233 deaths
12th-century Genoese people
13th-century Genoese people
People from Castellazzo Bormida
Italian Roman Catholic saints
13th-century Christian saints
Christians of the Third Crusade
Knights Hospitaller
Italian people in health professions